Aristotelia transfilata is a moth of the family Gelechiidae. It was described by Edward Meyrick in 1927. It is found on Samoa.

References

Moths described in 1927
Aristotelia (moth)
Moths of Oceania